Son cartas de amor is a 1943 Argentine comedy film directed by Luis César Amadori and starring Amelia Bence.

Cast
 Amelia Bence
 Enrique Chaico
 Ada Cornaro
 Pedro López Lagar
 Liana Moabro
 José Antonio Paonessa
 Hugo Pimentel
 Juan José Piñeiro
 Julio Renato
 José Ruzzo
 Aída Villadeamigo

References

External links
 

1943 films
1943 comedy films
Argentine comedy films
1940s Spanish-language films
Argentine black-and-white films
Films directed by Luis César Amadori
1940s Argentine films